John Joseph Witkowski (born June 18, 1962) is a former American football player.

Football career
John Witkowski was the winner of the 1982 Asa A. Bushnell Cup for leadership, competitive spirit, contribution to the team, and accomplishments on the field, Witkowski holds 12 Columbia Lions passing records, six total offense marks, and five Ivy League records. He remained a Lion after his collegiate career, being picked by Detroit Lions in the sixth round of the 1984 NFL Draft. He was also the first starting quarterback of the London Monarchs of the World League of American Football, although he lost his place in the team's very first game.

Personal life
He is currently President/CEO of the Independent Bankers Association of New York State and is a former executive vice president and retail banking executive for Five Star Bank.

References

1962 births
Living people
Sportspeople from Queens, New York
Players of American football from New York City
American football quarterbacks
Columbia Lions football players
Detroit Lions players
Houston Oilers players
London Monarchs players
Detroit Drive players